The National Amalgamated Union of Life Assurance Workers (NAULAW) was a trade union representing insurance workers in the United Kingdom and Ireland.

History
The union was founded in 1919 when the National Union of Life Insurance Agents merged with the National Association of Prudential Insurance Agents, the Blackburn Philanthropic Agents Association, the National Association of Wesleyan and General Insurance Agents, and the Planet Agents Association.  Although all the founding organisations mentioned insurance agents in their name, other workers in the industry, including managers and clerical staff, were also represented.

By 1923, the union already had 14,106 members, although this fell to only 7,722 by 1948, and just 2,238 by 1963.  It merged with the National Federation of Insurance Workers in 1964, forming the National Union of Insurance Workers.

Election results
The union sponsored a Labour Party candidate in several Parliamentary elections, including a Member of Parliament from 1942 to 1951.

General Secretaries
1919: B. Brooke
1926: W. Sheard
c.1950: W. B. Hannaford
1959: Frank Crump
1963: W. Hindson

References

External links
Catalogue of the NAULAW archives, held at the Modern Records Centre, University of Warwick

Defunct trade unions of the United Kingdom
Trade unions established in 1919
Trade unions disestablished in 1964
Trade unions based in Greater Manchester
Insurance industry trade unions